Forces Sweetheart (or Forces' Sweetheart) is an accolade given to entertainers, actors and singers originally in the United Kingdom who have become a favourite of soldiers in the British Armed Forces, though the term is used in other countries.

The role of being a favourite among armed forces personnel started during World War I. During this time, novelist Lady Angela Forbes was considered a "Forces Sweetheart" as a catering organiser for the British army from November 1914. The British Soldiers' Buffets, nicknamed "Angelinas", met every train of wounded as it arrived and were often open 24 hours a day, and food never ran out. 

Following her, actress and singer Elsie Janis was called The Sweetheart of the American Expeditionary Forces.

Examples

British forces' sweethearts

During World War II, the term "forces' sweetheart" was most commonly associated with Vera Lynn, (whose singing ("(There'll Be Bluebirds Over) The White Cliffs of Dover" and "We'll Meet Again" brought great happiness to many in Britain); others included Gracie Fields and Anne Shelton. 

Present-day sweethearts for the British forces include Nell McAndrew, Katherine Jenkins,  Kirsten Orsborn and Cheryl Cole.
In 2011 London drag queen Richard Rhodes became the first man to be awarded the title.

United States 

Frances Langford, an actress and singer, was billed as the "Singing Sweetheart of the Fighting Fronts" from World War II to the Korean War and the Vietnam War.

Commonwealth countries

Actress Lorrae Desmond, who was at that time best known a singer and recording artist, performed along fellow vocalists  Little Patti, Normie Rowe, Dinah Lee and numerous others as the "forces's sweetheart in Australia"  when troops were stationed in Vietnam. Desmond herself toured Vietnam, the Middle East, Malaysia, Singapore, Kenya and Somalia.

Literature
Joanna Lumley. Forces Sweethearts.  
Eric Taylor. Forces Sweethearts: Service romances in World War II. London: Hale 
Chantelle Fiddy. My Life on the Front.

References

External links
Women in World War II

British culture

Women in 21st-century warfare
Royal Air Force
Nicknames in film
Nicknames in music